The Rosie O'Donnell Show is an American daytime variety television talk show created, hosted, and produced by actress and comedian Rosie O'Donnell. It premiered on June 10, 1996, and concluded after six seasons on May 22, 2002.

This talk show was taped in Studio 8G at NBC's Rockefeller Center studios in New York City, New York, and was produced and distributed by KidRo Productions, Telepictures Productions, and Warner Bros. Television. The talk show won five Daytime Emmy Awards for Outstanding Talk Show.

History

Debut
On June 10, 1996, The Rosie O'Donnell Show premiered, and proved successful. It was a replacement for Carnie!, which aired from September 6, 1995, to February 23, 1996.

1996–1999
In October 1996, a fire broke out at 30 Rockefeller Center in New York City. As a result, the show resumed taping for four days in the Ed Sullivan Theater (where David Letterman taped his show). The first episode resuming taping in the regular studio featured a beginning scene reminiscent of The Wizard of Oz, in which Rosie awakens from a dream.

O'Donnell often spoke of her admiration for Barbra Streisand, and in November 1997, Streisand (who rarely grants interviews) agreed to a full hour special. The set was covered in flowers and Streisand memorabilia. Streisand's husband, actor James Brolin, was also interviewed. Before this interview, O'Donnell received a brief letter from Streisand which she discussed on-air and held up very briefly. She described Streisand as being very caring in the letter, but would not read it on-air. It was too late, however, as a television camera caught a brief shot of the letter, and within days, savvy viewers distributed its contents. O'Donnell later expressed dismay that viewers would do that. Streisand was interviewed again in 1999 at her home, shortly before her Timeless tour.

On May 19, 1999, a month after the Columbine shootings, which prompted O'Donnell to become an outspoken supporter of gun control and a major figure in the Million Mom March, O'Donnell interviewed actor Tom Selleck, who was promoting a film The Love Letter. After a commercial break, O'Donnell confronted him about his recent commercial for the NRA and challenged him about the NRA's position on the use of assault rifles. According to Selleck, the two had agreed not to discuss the topic before his appearance on the show. O'Donnell maintains that Selleck and his publicist had been informed that the topic would be discussed. She later stated the interview had "not gone the way I had hoped it had gone. But, I would like to thank you for appearing anyway, knowing that we have differing views. I was happy that you decided to come on the show. And if you feel insulted by my questions, I apologize, because it was not a personal attack. It was meant to bring up the subject as it is in the consciousness of so many today."

2000–2002
In April 2001, Rosie had a two-week absence from her show because of a staph infection. She had guest hosts take her place, including Joy Behar, Meredith Vieira, Barbara Walters, Kathy Griffin, Marie Osmond, Jane Krakowski, Ana Gasteyer and Caroline Rhea.

Throughout the final season O'Donnell called on Caroline Rhea to host the program every Friday. Rhea's growing popularity as a guest host gave her the green light to host her own daytime talk show the following year, supposedly succeeding O'Donnell. However, Rhea's program lasted for only one season.

Ending
After a six-year run, the show ended in 2002 when Rosie chose to leave to spend more time with her children.

The final live episode aired on May 22, 2002. It featured an opening musical ensemble number from Broadway, starring Vanessa Williams and John Lithgow (who were both appearing on Broadway at the time). The guests were Nathan Lane and Christine Ebersole. The show's final segment featured a retrospective video made by Rosie that blended scenes from her personal life with her talk show, accompanied by the song "Both Sides Now" sung by Joni Mitchell. The conclusion of the show featured a clip of Tom Cruise mowing a lawn, who then stops to look at the camera and says, "Rosie, I cut your grass, and here is your lemonade." (A reference to one of the show's running gags, O'Donnell declaring her adoration of Tom Cruise.)

Remaining new, but pre-taped, episodes continued to air until June 27, 2002, the last with guest host Caroline Rhea. Repeats aired until August 30, 2002, the last of which was a repeat of the broadcast from May 20, 2002.

Charity fundraiser
The show was revived for one night only March 22, 2020, during the COVID-19 pandemic, with an all-star lineup of guests raising money for the Actors Fund of America. The special episode was live streamed on the Broadway.com YouTube channel.

Format
Topics often discussed on the show include Broadway, children, extended families and charitable works, people and organizations.

The program was also known for featuring extended production numbers from Broadway shows which were often seen as too time-consuming on other shows. O'Donnell was known for keeping a light-hearted nature during the show as she playfully interviewed her guests and interacted with her audience. Commonly, O'Donnell would throw Koosh balls into the audience throughout the show; this gag expanded through the years to include automated Koosh-projecting devices in the ceiling, as well as O'Donnell firing at a moving target.

The house band was led by pianist John McDaniel, and was dubbed "The McDLTs".

Unique introductions by a member of the audience were made at the beginning of each episode. (Hi! I'm [insert audience member], from [insert resident's address] and this is The Rosie O'Donnell Show. On today's show: [insert guests and/or topics]. Hit it, John!). After the animated intro, the audience member would then say, "And now, here's Rosie!" as O'Donnell made her entrance through the curtain. O'Donnell commented on the DVD release of first season highlights that producers were not keen on this opening but Rosie insisted upon it as she enjoyed being able to talk to a "real person" every show.

Kids Are Punny
A long-running segment of the show involved telling jokes that children from around the United States mailed into the studio. These jokes were eventually compiled into two books (and eventually a TV special) entitled Kids Are Punny; proceeds from the book went to children's charity programs.

Product endorsements
O'Donnell's endorsement of the Tickle Me Elmo played a large part in the huge popularity of the toy. Likewise when she served Drake's snack cakes to audience members on The Rosie O'Donnell Show, which helped contribute to increased sales of Drake's cakes.

In February of 1997, the mouthwash brand  Scope released a list of the "least kissable celebrities," to which O'Donnell was ranked number one. O'Donnell responded by promoting rival mouthwash brand Listerine on her show. Listerine thanked O'Donnell by donating $1000 to O'Donnell's charity For All Kids every time a guest greeted O'Donnell with a kiss. Listerine donated more than $150,000.

Reception

Early on O'Donnell was dubbed "The Queen of Nice" by Newsweek magazine for her sweet personality, which was in stark contrast to many other talk shows of the era.

Awards and nominations
The show won multiple Emmys such as five times Daytime Emmy Award for Outstanding Talk Show (1998-2002) during its run.

Home media
A compilation of highlights of the show's first season was available for sale in September 2008, exclusively from the Home Shopping Network. The DVD runs 90 minutes and contains Rosie O'Donnell commenting while watching clips of archived footage. Included are Tom Cruise's first visit, Fran Drescher's parents reviewing Florida restaurants, and the incident in which Donny Osmond made a fat joke at Rosie's expense.

In 2021, O'Donnell began making interviews from the show available on her personal YouTube channel.

References

External links
 
 Jump The Shark – The Rosie O'Donnell Show

Season-by-season breakdown
The following site is no longer online, but was backed up by the Wayback Machine caching service:

 1st Season (1996-97) Guests
 2nd Season (1997-98) Guests
 3rd Season (1998-99) Guests
 4th Season (1999-00) Guests
 5th Season (2000-01) Guests
 6th Season (2001-02) Guests

First-run syndicated television programs in the United States
1990s American television talk shows
1996 American television series debuts
2000s American television talk shows
2002 American television series endings
Television series by Warner Bros. Television Studios
English-language television shows
Daytime Emmy Award for Outstanding Talk Show winners
Rosie O'Donnell
Television series by Telepictures